Pierson Parker (May 27, 1905 – December 13, 1995) was the son of Alvin Pierson and Susie Estelle (née Williams) Parker. He was professor of New Testament at the General Theological Seminary during the 1960s.

Pierson was best known for his work on the origins and priority of the Gospels.

After Morton Smith had published his two books on the Secret Gospel of Mark, Pierson published a somewhat critical review in The New York Times, wondering whether the document was “an early Christian cover-up” and saying that the passages “read not like Mark’s work but like a late and not wholly successful imitation” made before the time of Clement of Alexandria.

Pierson was also involved in the Today's English Version 1976.

Personal life
He was born in Shanghai, China. He married Mildred Ruth Sorg on the June 12, 1933. They had one son, Peter Pierson.

Works

Thesis

Books

Chapters

Journal articles

References

New Testament scholars
1905 births
1995 deaths
General Theological Seminary faculty